Pozzuoli is a city and comune of the Metropolitan City of Naples, in the Italian region of Campania. It is the main city of the Phlegrean Peninsula.

History

Pozzuoli began as the Greek colony of Dicaearchia founded in about 531 BC with the consent of nearby Cumae when refugees from Samos escaped from the tyranny of Polycrates.

The Samnites occupied Dicaearchia in 421 BC after conquering Cumae and may have changed its name to Fistelia. It enjoyed considerable political and commercial autonomy favoured by the excellent position of its port with the Campanian hinterland. The Roman occupation of Campania after the end of the 1st Samnite War from 341 BC marked the start of the Romanisation of the Greek-Samnite city.

During the Second Punic War (218-201 BC), Rome experienced the strategic importance of the port of Puteoli and reinforced the defences and introduced a garrison to protect the town from Hannibal, who failed to capture it in 215. They made it a Roman colony from 195 BC.
The Roman conquest of the east and the need for a port to trade made it the Mediterranean port of Rome, even though it was 150 miles away. It took the name Puteoli whose roots are in the Latin  (well or cistern). An alternative etymology of Puteoli derives from the Latin  (to stink), referring to the sulfuric fumes in the area, most notably from Solfatara.

Puteoli became the great emporium for the Alexandrian grain ships and other ships from all over the Roman world. It also was the main hub for goods exported from Campania, including blown glass, mosaics, wrought iron, and marble. Lucilius wrote in about 125 BC that it was second only to Delos in importance, then the greatest harbour of the ancient world. Many inscriptions show that a polyglot population established companies (stationes) for trade and transport and formed professional guilds for arts, crafts and religious associations for foreign cults; they included Greeks from the islands and the coast of Asia, Jews and later Christians. Under the Roman Empire, it was the greatest emporium of foreign trade in all of Italy. Trade with Tyre was so important that the Tyrians established a factory there in 174 (C.I. no. 5853).

The Roman naval base at nearby Misenum housed the largest naval fleet in the ancient world. It was also the site of the Roman Dictator Sulla's country villa and the place where he died in 78 BC. Cicero had a house in Puteoli and a villa nearby on the shore of the Lucrine Lake. Pliny mentions Puteoli as the site of a famed cochlearium created by Fulvius Hirpinus, known for raising exquisite snails.

The local volcanic sand, pozzolana (Latin: pulvis puteolanus, "dust of Puteoli") formed the basis for the first effective concrete, as it reacted chemically with water. Instead of just evaporating slowly off, the water would turn this sand/lime mix into a mortar strong enough to bind lumps of aggregate into a load-bearing unit. This made possible to construct the cupola of the Pantheon, which is still the world's largest unreinforced concrete dome.

The apostle Paul landed here on his way to Rome, from which it was  distant. Here he stayed for seven days (Acts 28:13, 14) and then began with his companions his journey by the Appian Way to Rome.

In 37 AD, Puteoli was the location for a political stunt by Emperor Gaius Caligula, who, on becoming Emperor, ordered a temporary floating bridge to be built using trading vessels, stretching for over two miles from the town to the famous neighboring resort of Baiae, across which he proceeded to ride his horse, in defiance of an astrologer's prediction that he had "no more chance of becoming Emperor than of riding a horse across the Gulf of Baiae".

With the development of the port of Ostia begun by Claudius in 42 AD, completed by Nero in 54 and enlarged by Trajan between 100 and 106, the fortunes of Puteoli began to decline although Antoninus Pius repaired the pier's storm damage in 139. Nero's abortive attempt to build the Fossa Neronis canal from Puteoli to Rome may have prolonged its life. As a reward for their support in the fight against Vitellius, Vespasian (r. 69-79 AD) installed more veterans there, assigned the city a part of the Capuan territory and gave it the title Colonia Flavia which it retained.

Hadrian died at Baiae in 138 and was interred at Cicero's villa at Puteoli, though he was later transferred to Rome.

Two aqueducts eventually served Puteoli; the Campanian aqueduct dating from the 1st c. BC at latest, and also the Aqua Augusta. Several cisterns still exist, including the very large Piscina di Cardito.

Saint Proculus (San Procolo) was martyred here with his companions in the fourth century and is the city's patron saint.  The seven eagle heads on the coat-of-arms for the town of Pozzuoli are said to represent seven of these martyrs. November 16 was the official feast day for Saint Proculus. St Proculus was affectionately nicknamed u pisciasotto ("the pants-pisser") because November 16 was often a day of rain.  The townspeople also celebrated his feast day on the second Sunday in May.

The city was taken and plundered by Alaric I in 410, by Genseric in 455, and by Totila in 545, from which it took centuries to recover.

Charles Lyell visited Pozzuoli in 1828 and studied the Macellum columns.

Since 1946, the town has been the home of the Accademia Aeronautica, the Italian Air Force Academy, which was first situated on the island of Nisida, then from 1962 on a purpose-built hilltop campus overlooking the bay.

From August 1982 to December 1984, the city experienced hundreds of tremors and bradyseismic activity, which peaked on 4 October 1983, damaging 8,000 buildings in the city centre and displacing 36,000 people, many permanently. The events raised the sea bottom by almost 2 m, and rendered the Bay of Pozzuoli too shallow for large craft.

Main sights

The town's attractions include:
Flavian Amphitheatre (Amphitheatrum Flavium), the third largest Italian amphitheatre after the Colosseum and the Capuan Amphitheatre. 
The Macellum of Pozzuoli, also known as the Temple of Serapis or serapeum, is considered the city's symbol. The "temple" was a marketplace. Its name derives from the misinterpretation of its function after a statue of the god Serapis was found in 1750. The Macellum includes three majestic columns in Cipollino marble, which show erosion from marine Lithophaga molluscs when, at an earlier time, the ground level was much lower due to Bradyseism, and sea-water could flow in.
Temple of Augustus (part of the cathedral)
Smaller Amphitheatre, very close to the Flavian one, its remains were absorbed by other buildings, but some arches can be seen by Via Solfatara and Via Vign
Roman Baths, the so-called Temple of Neptune, are the remains of a big thermal complex now in Corso Terracciano, which also included the nearby "Dianae Nymphaeum".
The Villa Avellino park has several Roman ruins and cisterns. There is also a still working Roman "face" water fountain.
Rione Terra, the first settlement of Puteoli, originally Dicearkia in Greek. 
Necropolis of Via Celle, a rich complex of tombs and mausoleums, very near to an old Roman road still used today (Via Cupa Cigliano).
Necropolis of the Via Puteolis Capuam, just under the bridge that leads outside the city near Via Solfatara.
Stadium of Antoninus Pius, a very similar stadium to the Domitian one in Rome, partially excavated (Via Campi Flegrei). 
The Piscina di Cardito cistern, second in size only to the Piscina Mirabilis, and used as a settlement tank for the water supply from the Aqua Augusta aqueduct.
Sanctuary of San Gennaro (St. Januarius). Along with the Cathedral of Naples, it is one of the two places where the alleged miracle of the liquefaction of the saint's blood occurs.
Solfatara (volcanic crater with active fumaroles)

Transportation
It is easily reached by train from Rome on Naples Metro line 2, and by the trains of "Cumana" lines leaving from the station of Montesanto, in the city center.

Neighbouring communes

Bacoli
Giugliano in Campania
Monte di Procida
Naples
Quarto

Notable people
 Januarius, Patron Saint of Naples, executed at Solfatara c. 305.
 Josephus landed there on his way to Rome (The Life of Flavius Josephus; 3.16).
 William Jopling, British leprologist, was born there.
 Sophia Loren, film actress, grew up there.
 Gilbert, Count of Montpensier, Viceroy of Naples, died there on 15 October 1496.
 Saint Paul, the Apostle landed there on his way to Rome (Acts 28:13).
 Giovanni Battista Pergolesi, Baroque composer, died there.
 Lucius Cornelius Sulla, Dictator of Rome, died at his villa there.

See also
De balneis Puteolanis

References

Bibliography
 Amalfitano, Paolo, et al. (1990) I Campi Flegrei, Venezia
 Annecchino, Raimondo (1960) Storia di Pozzuoli e della zona flegrea. Pozzuoli: Arti Grafiche D. Conte
 Gianfrotta, Piero Alfredo & Maniscalco, Fabio (eds.) (1998) Forma Maris: Forum Internazionale di Archeologia Subacquea. Puteoli

 Puteoli: studi di storia Romana; no. 2; 4/5
 Sommella, Paolo (1978) Forma e urbanistica di Pozzuoli romana. Pozzuoli: Azienda Autonoma di Soggiorno, Cura e Turismo di Pozzuoli
 Atti del convegno Studi e ricerche su Puteoli romana: Napoli, Centre J. Bérard, 2-3 aprile 1979. Napoli, 1984

External links

Kub Foto Pozzuoli
Pozzuoli Italian Portal (soon translated into English)

 
New Testament cities
Cities and towns in Campania
Coastal towns in Campania
Cumaean colonies
Coloniae (Roman)
Roman harbors in Italy
Roman sites of Campania
Archaeological sites in Campania